Prince Asubonteng (born 6 March 1986) is a Ghanaian footballer who last played for Dessel Sport of Belgium.

Asubonteng began his career at the age of 16 at Belgian club K.F.C. Germinal Beerschot. He was transferred to Racing de Ferrol of Spain in 2006, for which he played 20 games and scored 2 goals. In January 2008, he was sold to CD Baza, but left the club after six months to join former manager Marc Brys at FC Eindhoven.

Career

References 
 Profile at Goal.com
 Voetbal International
 

1986 births
Living people
Belgian footballers
Beerschot A.C. players
FC Eindhoven players
Belgian Pro League players
Eerste Divisie players
Ghanaian emigrants to Belgium
Racing de Ferrol footballers
Belgian expatriate footballers
Expatriate footballers in Spain
Expatriate footballers in the Netherlands
Belgian expatriate sportspeople in the Netherlands
K.F.C. Dessel Sport players
Challenger Pro League players
Footballers from Kumasi
Association football forwards